Xizicus is a genus of Asian bush crickets belonging to the tribe Meconematini in the subfamily Meconematinae. They are found in India, China, Korea, and Indochina.

Subgenera and species
The Orthoptera Species File currently lists the following species (Eoxizicus may be placed here or at the genus level):
subgenus Axizicus Gorochov, 1998
 Xizicus andamanensis (Kevan & Jin, 1993)
 Xizicus appendiculatus (Tinkham, 1944)
 Xizicus bifurcatus Liu, 2020
 Xizicus bispinus Jiao & Shi, 2014
 Xizicus falcata Chang, Du & Shi, 2013
 Xizicus furcus (Cui, Liu & Shi, 2020)
 Xizicus lineosus Gorochov & Kang, 2005
 Xizicus sergeji (Gorochov, 1998)
 Xizicus spinocercus Jiao & Shi, 2013 
Subgenus Furcixizicus Gorochov, 2002
 Xizicus bilobus (Bey-Bienko, 1962)
 Xizicus changi Gorochov, 2002
 Xizicus cryptostictus (Hebard, 1922)
 Xizicus furcicercus Gorochov, 2002
 Xizicus omelkoi Gorochov, 2019
 Xizicus siamensis (Karny, 1926)

References

External links
Image on Flickr
Image of X. fascipes at iNaturalist

Meconematinae
Tettigoniidae genera
Orthoptera of Asia